Deondray Gossfield also credited as Deondray Gossett (born May 20, 1973) is an American producer, director, screenwriter, and actor. Gossfield was part of the creative team that brought the short-lived GLAAD-award-winning series The DL Chronicles to cable TV in 2007.

In a career spanning more than two decades, Gossfield's work has covered many themes and genres. Gossfield's early acting work included roles in Sister Act 2: Back in the Habit and guest roles on TV series such as The Hughleys, Roswell, and The Parent 'Hood.

Deondray and his husband, Quincy LeNear Gossfield wrote Had U, which won first place at Showtime's Digital Media Festival for Best Experimental Short in 2000. Thereafter, The Gossfields worked on The DL Chronicles, and thereafter gained work as producers on reality TV shows such as America's Best Dance Crew, The Sing Off, Shake It Up Make Your Mark Ultimate Dance Off, Family Dance Off, The World Dog Awards, Roast of Justin Bieber, and the talk show Kocktails with Khloé.

Deondray and Quincy were married on national television during the 2014 56th Annual Grammy Awards during Macklemore's "Same Love" performance, officiated by Queen Latifah, featuring Madonna.

References

External links

American television directors
American screenwriters
1973 births
Living people
LGBT African Americans
American actors
American LGBT writers
21st-century LGBT people